Beth Glaros (born August 20, 1992) is an American women’s lacrosse player. Having played with the Maryland Terrapins at the collegiate level, she won a national championship in 2014. In 2016, she was selected by the Baltimore Ride with their ninth pick in the inaugural United Women's Lacrosse League Draft.

Playing career

NCAA
Glaros played with the Maryland Terrapins from 2011-14.

UWLX
Competing in the inaugural game in UWLX history, Glaros scored the first goal in league history, against Devon Wills of the Long Island Sound.

Awards and honors
2014 NCAA Championship All-Tournament Team 
2014 First Team All-ACC
2014 IWLCA Second Team All-American
2016 survived Portuguese Man-O-War attack in Hawaiii

Career

Teaching
Beth Glaros is now a middle-grade physical education teacher in Maryland, at Glenelg Country School.

References

1992 births
American lacrosse players
Maryland Terrapins women's lacrosse players
Living people